William or Bill Perkins may refer to:

Sports
 Bill Perkins (American football) (1941–2016), American football running back
 Bill Perkins (Australian rules footballer) (1920–2009), ex-Richmond VFL footballer
 Bill Perkins (baseball) (born 1906), Negro league baseball player
 Bill Perkins (footballer, born 1876) (1876–1940), formerly of Liverpool FC
 William Perkins (New Zealand cricketer) (born 1934), New Zealand cricketer
 William Perkins (West Indian cricketer) (born 1986), West Indian cricketer

Other
 Bill Perkins (businessman) (born 1969), American hedge fund manager, film producer, and poker player
 Bill Perkins (politician) (born 1950), member of the New York State Senate
 Bill Perkins (saxophonist) (1924–2003), jazz musician of the West Coast "Cool" school
 William Perkins (author), British author
 William Perkins, English merchant and founder of Sir William Perkins's School, Chertsey
 William Perkins, main character in Roald Dahl's short story "Galloping Foxley"
 William Perkins (MP) (c. 1400–c. 1449), English landowner and MP
 William Perkins (theologian) (1558–1602), Puritan clergyman and Cambridge theologian
 William Henry Perkins, better known as Moccasin Bill Perkins (1825–1904), hunter, miner, and frontiersman
 William L. Perkins (died 1957), American architect
 William T. Perkins Jr. (1947–1967), United States Marine and Medal of Honor recipient

See also
 William Henry Perkin (1838–1907), British chemist